Mindaugas Dumčius (born 	6 July 1995) is a Lithuanian handball player who currently plays for German club HC Elbflorenz 2006 e.V. and the Lithuania national team.

References

Lithuanian male handball players
People from Klaipėda
Living people
1995 births
Expatriate handball players
Lithuanian expatriate sportspeople in Germany